Henry King (January 24, 1886June 29, 1982) was an American actor and film director. Widely considered one of the finest and most successful filmmakers of his era, King was nominated for two Academy Awards for Best Director, and directed seven films nominated for the Academy Award for Best Picture.

Biography
Before coming to film, King worked as an actor in various repertoire theatres and first started to take small film roles in 1912. Between 1913 and 1925, he appeared as an actor in approximately sixty films. He directed for the first time in 1915 and grew to become one of the most commercially successful Hollywood directors of the 1920s and '30s. He was twice nominated for the Best Director Oscar. In 1944, he was awarded the first Golden Globe Award for Best Director for his film The Song of Bernadette. He worked most often with Tyrone Power and Gregory Peck and for 20th Century Fox.

Henry King was one of the 36 founders of the Academy of Motion Picture Arts and Sciences, which awards excellence of cinematic achievements every year, and was the last surviving founder. He directed more than 100 films in his career.

In 1955, King was awarded The George Eastman Award, given by the George Eastman House for distinguished contribution to the art of film.

During World War II, King served as the deputy commander of the Civil Air Patrol coastal patrol base in Brownsville, Texas, holding the grade of captain. In his final years, he was the oldest licensed private pilot in the United States, having obtained his license in 1918.

Henry King died of a heart attack while asleep at his home. He was 96 years old. King was interred with his second wife Ida Davis in the Davis King family plot at Myrtle Hill Cemetery in Tampa, Florida.

Partial filmography

Director

 Should a Wife Forgive? (1915)
 Little Mary Sunshine (1916)
 Pay Dirt (1916)
 Shadows and Sunshine (1916)
 The Mate of the Sally Ann (1917) 
 Twin Kiddies (1917)
 Beauty and the Rogue (1917)
 Sunshine and Gold (1917)
 A Game of Wits (1917)
 Told at Twilight (1917)
 The Bride's Silence (1917)
 Southern Pride (1917)
 Powers That Prey (1918) 
 Up Romance Road (1918)
 Hobbs in a Hurry (1918)
 Hearts or Diamonds? (1918)
 Social Briars (1918)
 The Locked Heart (1918)
 All the World to Nothing (1918)
 Where the West Begins (1919)
 Brass Buttons (1919)
 This Hero Stuff (1919)
 A Fugitive from Matrimony (1919)
 Six Feet Four (1919)
 Some Liar (1919)
 A Sporting Chance (1919
 Haunting Shadows (1919)
 One Hour Before Dawn (1920) 
 Dice of Destiny (1920)
 The White Dove (1920)
 Uncharted Channels (1920)
 Help Wanted - Male (1920)
 When We Were 21 (1921)
 The Sting of the Lash (1921)
 Salvage (1921) 
 Tol'able David (1921) 
 Sonny (1922)
 The Seventh Day (1922) 
 Fury (1923) 
 The Bond Boy (1923)
 The White Sister (1923) 
 Romola (1924) 
 Stella Dallas (1925) 
 The Winning of Barbara Worth (1926) 
 Partners Again (1926) 
 The Magic Flame (1927) 
 The Woman Disputed (1928)
 She Goes to War (1929)
 Hell Harbor (1930)
 The Eyes of the World (1930)
 Lightnin' (1930) 
 Merely Mary Ann (1931) 
 Over the Hill (1931) 
 The Woman in Room 13 (1932) 
 State Fair (1933)
 I Loved You Wednesday (1933) 
 Marie Galante (1934) 
 One More Spring (1935)
 Way Down East (1935)
 The Country Doctor (1936) 
 Ramona (1936)
 Lloyd's of London (1936) 
 Seventh Heaven (1937)
 In Old Chicago (1937) 
 Alexander's Ragtime Band (1938)
 Jesse James (1939)
 Stanley and Livingstone (1939)
 Little Old New York (1940)
 Maryland (1940)
 Chad Hanna 1940)
 A Yank in the RAF (1941)
 Remember the Day (1941)
 The Black Swan (1942)
 The Song of Bernadette (1943) 
 Wilson (1944)
 A Bell for Adano (1945)
 Margie (1946) 
 Captain from Castile (1947) 
 Deep Waters (1948)
 Prince of Foxes (1949) 
 Twelve O'Clock High (1949)
 The Gunfighter (1950)
 I'd Climb the Highest Mountain (1951)
 David and Bathsheba (1951)
 O. Henry's Full House (1952)
 The Snows of Kilimanjaro (1952)
 Wait till the Sun Shines, Nellie (1952) 
 King of the Khyber Rifles (1953)
 Untamed (1955) 
 Love Is a Many-Splendored Thing (1955) 
 Carousel (1956)
 The Sun Also Rises (1957) 
 The Bravados (1958)
 This Earth Is Mine (1959) 
 Beloved Infidel (1959) 
 Tender Is the Night (1962)

Actor

 Who Pays? (1915)
 Should a Wife Forgive? (1915) - Jack Holmes
 Little Mary Sunshine (1916) - Bob Daley
 Pay Dirt (1916) - The Easterner
 The Power of Evil (1916) - Stuart Merwin
 Shadows and Sunshine (1916) - Minor Role (uncredited)
 Joy and the Dragon (1916) - Hal Lewis
 Twin Kiddies (1917) - Jasper Hunt
 In the Hands of the Law (1917)
 The Devil's Bait (1917)
 Told at Twilight (1917) - The Father
 Sunshine and Gold (1917) - The Chauffeur
 Hearts or Diamonds? (1918)
 The Locked Heart (1918) - Harry Mason
 Help Wanted - Male (1920) - Tubbs
 Ben-Hur: A Tale of the Christ (1925) - Chariot Race Spectator (uncredited) (final film role)

Academy Awards

References

External links

Forgotten By Fox: Henry King of the Khyber Rifles

1886 births
1982 deaths
Academy of Motion Picture Arts and Sciences founders
People from Christiansburg, Virginia
Film directors from Virginia
Western (genre) film directors
People from Toluca Lake, Los Angeles
Film directors from Los Angeles
American male silent film actors
20th-century American male actors
Male actors from Virginia
Male actors from Los Angeles
Burials at Holy Cross Cemetery, Culver City